James VandeHei (born February 12, 1971) is an American journalist and businessman who is the co-founder and CEO of Axios and the former executive editor and co-founder of Politico. Previously, he was a national political reporter at The Washington Post, where he worked as White House correspondent.

Early life and education
VandeHei was born in Oshkosh, Wisconsin, and graduated from Lourdes High School in 1989. In 1995, he graduated from the University of Wisconsin–Oshkosh with a double major in journalism and political science. As an undergraduate, he interned at The Brillion News in Brillion, Wisconsin during the summer of 1993. He later interned in the office of Democratic Senator Herb Kohl in 1994, which led to his decision to become a political journalist.

Career 
After working as a sports reporter for the Oshkosh Northwestern, VandeHei moved to Washington, D.C. In 1995, began working for Inside Washington Publishers. In 1996, he was hired by "Inside the New Congress," a weekly newsletter that focuses on the House and Senate. In 1997, he began working as a reporter for Roll Call, which covers Capitol Hill. While at Roll Call, VandeHei broke the story of House Speaker-elect Bob Livingston's affairs in 1998. He was the first to report in 1998 that Republicans were formally planning to impeach Bill Clinton.

After a stint as a national political reporter for The Wall Street Journal in 2000, VandeHei joined The Washington Post.

VandeHei's work has appeared in Capital Style and The New Republic. He has appeared as a pundit on television shows on all the major networks.

In 2006, VandeHei left The Washington Post to co-found a political publication, Politico.

In early 2016, it was announced that VandeHei was leaving Politico after the presidential election. In April he abruptly left, prior to his previously stated departure date, and penned a piece in The Information about the current vapid state of media, the downward spiral of chasing clicks, and the media's future.

Personal life 
He is married to Autumn Hanna VandeHei, a former staffer for House Republican Leader Tom DeLay of Texas who served as Deputy Assistant Secretary for Legislation (Human Services) in the Presidency of George W. Bush. She was an executive producer of I Am Jane Doe, a film on sex trafficking. Jim and Autumn have three children and reside in Alexandria, Virginia.

References

External links
Profile at Politico

 100 People To Watch, Washingtonian, December 1999
 White House correspondent, Oshkosh alum relays experiences, Jacob Phillips, Advance Titan, March 30, 2005

1971 births
American newspaper reporters and correspondents
Living people
University of Wisconsin–Oshkosh alumni
People from Oshkosh, Wisconsin
Writers from Wisconsin
The Washington Post journalists
The Wall Street Journal people
Politico people
21st-century American journalists